

The Black Dog Institute is a not-for-profit facility for diagnosis, treatment and prevention of mood disorders such as depression, anxiety and bipolar disorder. It was founded in 2002 by the UNSW School of Psychiatry Scientia Professor Gordon Parker and is based in Sydney, Australia.

Research

The Black Dog Institute undertakes research into the prevention, early intervention and treatment of depression, bipolar disorder, PTSD, and anxiety. They partner with the Australian Centre for Research Excellence in Suicide Prevention (CRESP) concerned with lowering suicide rates in Australia. According to CRESP, suicide is the most common cause of death in Australians aged 15–44 years – more common than deaths from motor vehicle accidents or skin cancer and the tenth most common cause of death overall for Australian males. The problem is worse in rural and regional areas, according to a 2012 study by Griffith University.

The Black Dog Institute launched “Men’s Health Study” in 2014, with the aim of identifying ways to prevent male suicides and developing mental health tools designed specifically for men. Based on this research, the Black Dog Institute launched an online program, Man Central, that helps men identify early signs of depression and provides tips on how to cope.

In 2018, Black Dog Institute became part of a cooperative partnership of four clinical, educational and research allies, including Neuroscience Research Australia (NeuRA), South Eastern Sydney Local Health District (SESLHD) and UNSW Sydney to create Mindgardens Neuroscience Network, which became the largest brain-related collaboration between researchers and clinicians in the Southern Hemisphere.

Services

The Black Dog Institute runs three clinics available to Australian residents: Depression and Bipolar Clinic, Psychology Clinic, Child and Adolescent Clinic, Rural and Telepsychiatry Clinic. Additionally, the facility offers seminars and workshops on mood disorders, well being and related topics. The Black Dog Institute has developed a range of online tools including: myCompass, BITE BACK, and self-tests for depression, bipolar disorder, personality and workplace well being.

References

External links 

Black Dog Institute on Twitter

Mental health organisations in Australia
Organizations established in 2002
2002 establishments in Australia
Charities based in Australia